Raising the Bar is a 2015 Hong Kong modern legal drama series produced by TVB. It stars Ben Wong, Louis Cheung, Ram Chiang and Grace Chan as the main leads, with Elaine Yiu, Jeannie Chan, Stephanie Ho, Timothy Cheng and Moon Lau as the major supporting cast. Natalie Tong and Elena Kong guest star this series. Filming of the series took place from June till September 2014. The series began airing 26 January 2015 and ended its run on 27 February 2015. It was broadcast on weekdays, Monday to Friday, by TVB's Jade channel in the 8:30–9:30 pm timeslot.

Synopsis
A group of barristers and trainee lawyers vow to pursue justice and ideals, but the process is fraught with difficulties. Regarded as the "Condor Heroes" of the legal world, barristers Marcus Fan (Ben Wong) and his wife Vivian Cheung (Elaine Yiu) have taught many students. Among them, Giselle Tong (Grace Chan), Brittany Fok (Jeannie Chan) and Quinton Chow (Louis Cheung) are Marco's favourites. Giselle's classmate, Holly Tsang (Moon Lau), is a trainee solicitor at Vivian's law firm, while Chris Yiu (Stephanie Ho) trains under barrister Duncan Yam (Timothy Cheng). Brittany's elder half-sister, Ashley Cheng (Natalie Tong), has an affair with the married Duncan and later switches over to work for Marcus. With each of them using their own methods, how do these rookies become qualified legal practitioners, in a journey that is full of struggle, doubt and tough choices about their future? Theory turns into practice as they handle tricky cases and experience success and failures, while also dealing with love, family and friendship problems every day. Their biggest test arrives when legal standards challenge their personal orientations.

Main Cast
Ben Wong (黃智賢) as Marcus Fan Chi-ngai (范智毅)
Louis Cheung (張繼聰) as Quinton Chow Tsz-pok (周梓博)
Ram Chiang (蔣志光) as Woody Lam Sam-muk (林森木)
Grace Chan (陳凱琳) as Giselle Tong Ching-chi (唐靖姿)

Guest Cast
Natalie Tong (唐詩詠) as Ashley Cheng Cheuk-tung (鄭妁彤)
Elena Kong (江美儀) as Judge Amanda Lui (呂官)

Recurring Cast
Elaine Yiu (姚子羚) as Vivian Cheung Wai-wan (張慧芸)
Jeannie Chan (陳瀅) as Brittany Fok Chi-ying (霍紫凝)
Stephanie Ho (何雁詩) as Chris Yiu Chui-fa (姚翠花)
Timothy Cheng (鄭子誠) as Duncan Yam Suen-yip (任雋燁)
Moon Lau (劉佩玥) as Holly Tsang Ho-yan (曾可欣)
King Lam (林景程) as Lincoln Chai On-kui (齊安居)
Sunny Dai (戴耀明) as Kuk Tat-kan (谷達勤)
Andy Siu (邵卓堯) as Paul
Matthew Ho (何廣沛) as Max Kwong
Sam Tsang (曾航生) as Don Chu Yiu-lik (朱耀力)
Hugo Wong (黃子恆) as Hanson Chui Yin-chit (崔賢哲)
Alex Tsui (徐家傑) as Fok Koon-tung (霍貫東)
Li Shing-cheong (李成昌) as Chan Keung (陳強)
Mimi Chu (朱咪咪) as Ng Suk-fan (吳淑芬)
Chun Wong (秦煌) as Chow Chung-cheung (周忠祥)
Hinson Chou (周子揚) as Jaydon Ngai Chung-hang 危仲衡
MoMo Wu (吳沚默) as Lee Dan (李丹)
Ali Lee (李佳芯) as Shum Lai-ching (岑麗清)
Skye Chan (陳倩揚) as Sabrina Fong Tin-na (方天娜)
Stefan Wong (黃長興) as Kelvin
Gary Chan (陳嘉輝) as Judge Ho (何官)
Wendy Hon (韓毓霞) as Judge Wong (王官)
Joseph Yeung (楊瑞麟) as Judge Chan (陳官)
Eddie Li (李岡龍) as Judge Lai (賴官)
Dolby Kwan (關浩揚) as Roy
Mary Hon (韓馬利) as Holly's mother (曾可欣之媽)
Steve Lee (李家鼎) as Holly's father (曾可欣之爸)
Helen Ng (吳香倫) as Lam Mui (林梅)
Johnson Law (羅莽) as Sit Kim (薛劍)
Judy Tsang (曾敏) as Yeung Lau (楊柳)
Snow Suen (孫慧雪) as KeiKei (淇淇)
Suet Nei (雪妮)
Jacquelin Chong (莊思敏) as Lawyer Yiu (姚律師)
Jack Hui (許家傑) as Alex Lam Chin-sum (林展信)

Alternate ending
An alternate ending was shown for the overseas broadcast of the drama. The scene depicts the lawyers in a silent protest in support of Hong Kong's continued judicial independence. The scene is in reference to the real life event that happened in Hong Kong during the "White Paper" protest in June 2014.

Development
Filming of the series took place from June till September 2014.
The costume fitting ceremony was held on 7 June 2014 12:30 p.m. at Tseung Kwan O TVB City Studio One.
The blessing ceremony was held on 26 June 2014 2:00 p.m. at Tseung Kwan O TVB City.

Viewership ratings

Awards and nominations

References

External links
Official Website

TVB dramas
Hong Kong television series
2015 Hong Kong television series debuts
2015 Hong Kong television series endings
2010s Hong Kong television series
Hong Kong legal television series